Dry Fork is an unincorporated community in Randolph and Tucker counties, West Virginia, United States. Dry Fork has a post office with ZIP code 26263.

The community takes its name from nearby Dry Fork Cheat River. It is near the Dolly Sods Wilderness.

Demographics

2010 census
At the 2010 census there were 781 people, 333 households, and 260 families living in the town. The racial makup of the town was 100% White.

Of the 333 households 34.8% had children under the age of 18 living with them, 65.2% were married couples living together, 6.0% had a female householder with no husband present, 0% had a male householder with no wife present, and 2.4% were non-families. 19.5% of households were one person.

16.9% of residents were under the age of 18; 4.99% were between the ages of 18 and 21; 19.5% were from 22 to 39; 33.5% were from 40 to 64; and 25.1% were 65 or older.

References

Unincorporated communities in Randolph County, West Virginia
Unincorporated communities in West Virginia